Charles Claxton Jr. (born December 13, 1970) is a former American professional basketball player.

Born in Saint Thomas, U.S. Virgin Islands, he attended Miami Carol City High School in Miami, Florida, and played collegiately for the University of Georgia.

He was selected by the Phoenix Suns in the second round (50th pick overall) of the 1994 NBA draft.

He played for the Boston Celtics (1995–96) in the National Basketball Association (NBA) for 3 games. He  also was under contract with the Cleveland Cavaliers (October 1995) and Utah Jazz (October 1996), but did not play in any regular season NBA games for those teams.

His son Nic Claxton is a professional basketball player in the NBA for the Brooklyn Nets, and his other son, Chase Claxton, plays Division I college basketball for Winthrop University.

References

External links

1970 births
Living people
African-American basketball players
American expatriate basketball people in Lithuania
American expatriate basketball people in Poland
American expatriate basketball people in the United Kingdom
American men's basketball players
American people of United States Virgin Islands descent
Boston Celtics players
Brighton Bears players
Centers (basketball)
Georgia Bulldogs basketball players
KK Włocławek players
LSU-Atletas basketball players
Phoenix Suns draft picks
People from Saint Thomas, U.S. Virgin Islands
United States Virgin Islands men's basketball players
United States Virgin Islands expatriate sportspeople
21st-century African-American sportspeople
20th-century African-American sportspeople
Criollos de Caguas basketball players